Ahmad Kazemi (22 July 1958 – 9 January 2006) was an Iranian commander in the Islamic Revolutionary Guard Corps and one of the most notable commanders in Iran–Iraq War.

Early life
He was born on 22 July 1958 in Najaf Abad, Isfahan. His father, Eshghali, was a commander of Imperial Army of Iran but withdrew in 1974 before the beginning of the Iranian Revolution. They moved to Lebanon in 1975. Ahmad with his father joined the fighters in Southern Lebanon. With the emergence of the Iranian revolution, he struggled against monarchy. After the victory of the Revolution and establishment of IRGC (Sepah) in 1980, he joined the Sepah and went to Kurdistan in 1981 to fight in the 1979 Kurdish rebellion in Iran.

Military career
As Iran–Iraq War began, he joined the war with a 50-member group in Abadan fronts and began fighting with Iraq. At the end of the war, the 50-member group became a powerful and important division of Sepah. Direct presence at the front line lead to injuries of his leg, hands and back. One of his fingers was cut. After the end of the war, he attended the university and got a BA degree in Geography and a master's degree in management and defense spending. He made his doctoral studies in the field of national defense. He was appointed as Commander of Ground Forces of the Islamic Revolutionary Guard Corps on 1 June 2005 by the Supreme Leader Ali Khamenei. He was one of the military advisors to Presidents Ali Akbar Hashemi Rafsanjani and Mahmoud Ahmadinejad.

He was a close friend of Mehdi Bakeri and Hossein Kharrazi as well as Quds Force commander Qasem Soleimani.

IRGC Air Force Commander
Ahmad Kazemi was appointed as the commander of 14th Imam Hossein Division on 18 December 1997, and was subsequently appointed to the Air Forces of the Army of the Guardians of the Islamic Revolution (IRGC AF) Commander on 29 June 2000.

During his tenure in the IRGC Air Force, Kazemi took effective measures to improve the quality of the air force in terms of organization and structure, and for the first time equipped the IRGC AF with close air support Sukhoi Su-25 aircraft, and equipped the IRGC AF helicopter organization with purchased Mil Mi-17 helicopters. He was also in contact with the IRGC's missile unit and assisted Hassan Tehrani Moghaddam in developing ballistic missile projects.

When the Bam earthquake happened in year 2003, Kazemi mobilized the IRGC AF fleet to rescue the Bam earthquake victims by preparing the Bam Airport. Such a way that, a plane and a helicopter flew in every 13 minutes and a total of 30 thousand wounded were moved by the IRGC AF fleet.

Personal life
He was married in 1978. He had two sons, Mohammad Mehdi (born 1980) and Saeed (born 1989). His eldest son, Mohammad Mehdi is now a civil engineer.

Death
He was killed in a falcon plane crash near Urmia. According to the Aviation Safety Network, the plane "crash-landed in a field in poor weather conditions... Reports indicate that the crew did not get three greens after selecting the gear down while on approach to Orumiyeh Airport. A flypast was done so the control tower could observe the status of the landing gear. While circling the airplane suffered a double engine flame-out, reportedly as a result of engine icing. An emergency landing was attempted in a field, but the Falcon crashed". Reports that the plane crashed due to sabotage or a bomb are still unproven. His funeral was held in Tehran and Iranian Leader Ali Khamenei attended as well.

In a letter, Iran's Leader Ali Khamenei wrote that,

See also
 Mehdi Zeinoddin
 Ali Hashemi (Commander)
 Mohammad Ebrahim Hemmat

References

 In the mourning of Haj Ahmad Kazemi aftabir.com

External links

 Official Website (Persian)

1958 births
2006 deaths
Islamic Revolutionary Guard Corps personnel of the Iran–Iraq War
People from Najafabad
Recipients of the Order of Fath
Victims of aviation accidents or incidents in Iran
Islamic Revolutionary Guard Corps brigadier generals